Brian Foulds (born 14 December 1944) is a New Zealand cricketer. He played in five first-class matches for Northern Districts from 1969 to 1971.

See also
 List of Northern Districts representative cricketers

References

External links
 

1944 births
Living people
New Zealand cricketers
Northern Districts cricketers
Cricketers from Melbourne